Endre Kupen (born 1 July 1990) is a Norwegian football player who plays for Norwegian OBOS-ligaen side Sogndal.

Career
After having been Florø's top goal scorer in the 2017 1. divisjon, he signed for Glimt on November 27, 2017. Kupen suffered a ligament injury shortly after his arrival at Glimt, keeping him on the sidelines for the duration of the 2018-season. After limited playing time at Bodø/Glimt Kupen signed for Sogndal.

Career statistics

Club

References

External links
 Profile at glimt.no

Eliteserien players
Norwegian First Division players
Norwegian footballers
Association football forwards
Florø SK players
FK Bodø/Glimt players
Sogndal Fotball players
Living people
1990 births